Brachytarsomys is a genus of rodent in the family Nesomyidae. 
It contains the following species:
 White-tailed antsangy (Brachytarsomys albicauda)
 Brachytarsomys mahajambaensis (extinct)
 Hairy-tailed antsangy (Brachytarsomys villosa)

References

 
Rodent genera
Taxa named by Albert Günther
Taxonomy articles created by Polbot